UTA Flight 772 was a scheduled international passenger flight of the French airline Union de Transports Aériens (UTA) operating from Brazzaville in the People's Republic of the Congo, via N'Djamena in Chad, to Charles de Gaulle Airport in Paris, France, that crashed into the Ténéré desert near Bilma, Niger, on 19 September 1989 with the loss of all 170 people on board, after an in-flight explosion caused by a suitcase bomb. It is the deadliest aviation incident to occur in Niger.

Aircraft and crew
The aircraft, a McDonnell Douglas DC-10-30, with American registration  serial number 46852, was manufactured in 1973. It was the 125th DC-10 produced, and had accumulated 14,777 flight cycles over 60,276 flight hours at the time of its hull loss.

The captain, 40-year-old Georges Raveneau, was an experienced pilot, with a total of 11,039 flight hours, 2,723 of which were on the DC-10. The left-seat pilot, 38-year-old Jean-Pierre Hennequin, had a total of 6,442 flight hours, 28 of which were on the DC-10. The first officer, 41-year-old Michel Crézé, had a total of 8,357 flight hours, 754 of which were on the DC-10. The flight engineer, 28-year-old Alain Bricout, had a total of 597 flight hours, 180 of which were on the DC-10.

Incident
On Tuesday, 19 September 1989 the McDonnell Douglas DC-10 aircraft took off from N'Djamena International Airport at 13:13. The explosion scattered debris over hundreds of square miles of desert. All 156 passengers and 14 crew members died.

Victims

Among the victims was Bonnie Pugh (née Barnes), wife of Robert L. Pugh, American ambassador to Chad at the time.

Eight of the fatalities were oil workers (from Esso, Parker, Schlumberger) coming back from the completed drilling of the Kome-3 borehole in southern Chad.

After the plane was bombed, Leonardo Leonardi, a spokesperson for the Italian Embassy in Paris, said that the embassy believed that six Italians were on the flight. A spokesperson of the Friars Minor Capuchin religious order said that two members of the order were on board the aircraft. The bishop of Moundou was on the flight.

The victims came from 18 different countries, the majority being French, Chadian, and Congolese nationals: 54 French, 48 nationals of People's Republic of Congo, 25 Chadians, 9 Italians, 7 Americans, 5 Cameroonians, 4 Britons, 3 nationals of Zaire (now Democratic Republic of the Congo), 3 Canadians, 2 Central Africans, 2 Malians, 2 Swiss, 1 Algerian, 1 Bolivian, 1 Belgian, 1 Greek, 1 Moroccan and 1 Senegalese.

Investigation
An investigation commission of the International Civil Aviation Organization determined that a bomb placed in a container in location 13-R in the forward cargo hold caused the destruction of the aircraft. The commission suggested that the most plausible hypothesis was for the bomb to have been inside the baggage loaded at Brazzaville airport. Initial speculation over which groups might have been responsible for destroying UTA Flight 772 centered upon Islamic Jihad, who were quick to claim responsibility for the attack, and the "Secret Chadian Resistance" rebel group, which opposed president Hissen Habré. Five years previously, on 10 March 1984, a bomb destroyed another UTA aircraft from Brazzaville shortly after the DC-8 had landed at N'Djamena airport. There were no fatalities on that occasion and those responsible were never identified.

Trial in absentia
The investigators obtained a confession from one of the alleged terrorists, a Congolese opposition figure, who had helped recruit a fellow dissident to smuggle the bomb onto the aircraft. This confession led to charges being brought against six Libyans. French judge Jean-Louis Bruguière identified them, as follows:

 Abdullah Senussi, brother-in-law of Muammar Gaddafi, and deputy head of Libyan intelligence;
 Abdullah Elazragh, Counsellor at the Libyan embassy in Brazzaville;
 Ibrahim Naeli and Arbas Musbah, explosives experts in the Libyan secret service;
 Issa Shibani, the secret agent who purchased the timer that allegedly triggered the bomb; and,
 Abdelsalam Hammouda, Senussi's right-hand man, who was said to have coordinated the attack.

In 1999, the six Libyans were put on trial in the Paris Assize Court for the bombing of UTA Flight 772. Because Gaddafi would not allow their extradition to France, the six were tried in absentia and were convicted.

On 5 September 2012, the country of Mauritania extradited Abdullah Senussi to Libyan authorities. Senussi was to be tried in Libya for crimes he allegedly committed during the time he was the close assistant to Gaddafi. Senussi appeared in a Libyan court for a pre-trial hearing on 19 September 2013. On 11 October 2013, the International Criminal Court ruled that he can be tried in Libya and lifted their warrant.

Alleged motive
The motive usually attributed to Libya for the UTA Flight 772 bombing is that of revenge against the French for supporting Chad against the expansionist projects of Libya toward Chad. Similar to the motives for the September 11 attacks where there was the presence of United States troops in Saudi Arabia.

The Chadian–Libyan conflict (1978–1987) ended in disaster for Libya following the defeat at the Battle of Maaten al-Sarra in the 1987 Toyota War.  Muammar Gaddafi was forced to accede to a ceasefire ending the Chadian-Libyan conflict and his dreams of African and Arab dominance. Gaddafi blamed the defeat on French and United States "aggression against Libya". The result was Gaddafi's lingering animosity against the two countries which led to Libyan support for the bombings of Pan Am Flight 103 and UTA Flight 772.

Libyan compensation
The Paris court awarded the families of the UTA victims sums ranging from €3 000 to €30 000 depending on their relationship to the dead. Not content with this award, the French relatives' group "Les Familles du DC10 d'UTA" signed an agreement on 9 January 2004 with the Gaddafi International Foundation for Charity Associations accepting a compensation payment of US$170 million, or $1 million for each of the 170 UTA victims. By May 2007, it was reported that 95% of this compensation money had been distributed. However, the families of the seven American victims refused to accept their US$1 million awards and are pursuing the Libyan government through a federal court in Washington. On 19 September 2006, the court was asked to rule that the Libyan government and six of its agents were guilty of the destruction of UTA Flight 772 on 19 September 1989. Damages of more than US$2 billion were claimed for the loss of life and the destruction of the DC-10 jet.

In April 2007, D.C. District Judge Henry H. Kennedy found Libya directly responsible for the bombing and presided over a three-day bench trial from 13 August 2007 to 15 August 2007. On 15 January 2008, Judge Kennedy issued an order awarding US$6 billion in damages to the families and owners of the airliner. Libya has appealed this decision.

In October 2008 Libya paid $1.5 billion into a fund which will be used to compensate relatives of the
Lockerbie bombing victims;
American victims of the 1986 Berlin discotheque bombing;
American victims of the 1989 UTA Flight 772 bombing; and,
Libyan victims of the 1986 US bombing of Tripoli and Benghazi.

As a result, U.S. President George W. Bush signed an executive order restoring the Libyan government's immunity from terror-related lawsuits and dismissing all of the pending compensation cases in the U.S.

Other statements
In Manipulations Africaines (African Manipulations), published in February 2001, Pierre Péan investigated the sabotage of UTA Flight 772. He alleged that evidence pointed to Iran and Syria (acting through the Hezbollah movement), but that due to political context (notably the Gulf War), France and the United States tried to put the blame on Libya. He accuses judge Jean-Louis Bruguière of deliberately neglecting proof of Lebanon, Syria and Iran being involved to pursue only the Libyan trail. He also accused Thomas Thurman, a Federal Bureau of Investigation explosives expert, of fabricating false evidence against Libya in both the Pan Am Flight 103 and UTA Flight 772 sabotages.

On 18 July 2011, former Libyan foreign minister Abdel Rahman Shalgham, who had defected from the Libyan government in March at the beginning of what would become the 2011 Libyan civil war, told al-Hayat that the Libyan government was responsible for the bombing of UTA Flight 772. He stated "The Libyan security services blew up the plane. They believed that opposition leader Mohammed al-Megrief was on board, but after the plane was blown up, it was found that he was not on the plane." He also claimed that "The Lockerbie operation was more complex ... the role of states and organizations has been discussed, and while the Libyan services were implicated, I do not think it was a purely Libyan operation."

Memorial
In 2007 a memorial was created in the desert by Les Familles de l'Attentat du DC-10 d'UTA, an association of the victims' families. The stabilizer carries a plaque with the names of those on board. The memorial is visible in aerial imagery on Google Maps.

The organizer of the memorial was Frenchman Guillaume Denoix de Saint Marc, whose father, Jean-Henri, died on the flight.

In popular culture
Rush drummer Neil Peart mentioned this incident at length in his travel memoir, The Masked Rider: Cycling in West Africa, as he had taken this flight less than a year prior to the incident from N'Djamena to Paris once he was finished with his Cameroon bicycling tour.

Maps

See also
 Air India Flight 182
 List of accidents and incidents involving commercial aircraft
 Pan Am Flight 73
 Pan Am Flight 103
 Pierre Péan

References

Further reading

External links
 Final report (Archive) 
 English translation of final report Prepared by Harro Ranter, Aviation Safety Network (Archive)
 Appendices (Archive)
  
 Additional photos of memorial and its construction

772
Airliner bombings
Aviation accidents and incidents in 1989
Terrorist incidents in Africa in 1989
Aviation accidents and incidents in Niger
History of the United Nations
1989 in Chad
1989 in Niger 
1989 disasters in Niger 
1989 in France
1989 in Libya
1989 in the Republic of the Congo
Accidents and incidents involving the McDonnell Douglas DC-10
Chadian–Libyan War
Mass murder in 1989
France–Libya relations
September 1989 crimes
Terrorist incidents in Niger
Terrorism committed by Libya